Naša TV was a Herzegovinian/Bosnian local commercial cable television channel based in Mostar, Bosnia and Herzegovina. Television channel is launched in March 2016 and it produces in Croatian. "Naša TV" literally means "Our TV", in Croatian.

Naša TV is available via cable systems throughout the Bosnia and Herzegovina and target audience is in Herzegovina-Neretva Canton, West Herzegovina and Canton 10, Central Bosnia and Posavina Canton and part of Sarajevo Canton.

External links 
 Official website of Naša TV
 Naša TV in Facebook  
 Communications Regulatory Agency of Bosnia and Herzegovina

References 

Defunct television channels in Bosnia and Herzegovina
Television channels and stations established in 2016